The International Bank of Azerbaijan-Georgia ("IBA-Georgia" for short) is a subsidiary bank of the International Bank of Azerbaijan located in Tbilisi, Georgia, founded in 2007. It is one of three Azerbaijani banks operating in Georgia. The bank is a member of the Association of Banks of Georgia.

History 
According to the United States - Azerbaijan Chamber of Commerce, the bank was founded with 100 percent foreign capital. Initially, $7 million in authorized shares were issued upon the bank's founding. The bank was founded by the International Bank of Azerbaijan (owns 75%), the Azerbaijan Industrial Bank (12.5%), and a private individual (12.5%).
 2010: IBA-Georgia began to issue VISA International bank cards.
 2011: The bank became a member of the Banking Association for Central and Eastern Europe (known as BACEE).

 2012: The bank reached an annual growth rate of 71.3 percent. The bank's loan portfolio grew from GEL 57.1 million to GEL 97.7 million between 2011 and 2012. By 2012, the bank had 1,462 corporate and individual customers.
 2014: IBA-Georgia increased its net profit by 13 percent over the previous year.

People
The bank's leadership consists of executive management, the Supervisory Council, and the Board of Directors:

Source:

External links 
 Banks in Tbilisi list by Info-Tbilisi Group
 Consumer reviews of IBA-Georgia at Companies-Reviews.com
 Swift Codes for International Bank of Azerbaijan - Georgia at Swift-Code.org operated by S.W.I.F.T. SCRL

See also

 Georgia (country)
 International Bank of Azerbaijan
 International banking
 List of banks in Georgia (country)

Notes

References

Banks of Georgia (country)
Companies based in Tbilisi